San Donaci is a comune in the province of Brindisi in Apulia, on the southeast coast of Italy. Its main economic activities are tourism and the growing of olives and grapes.

References

Cities and towns in Apulia
Localities of Salento